Hyperion is the name of a  sailing yacht built by the Royal Huisman in the Netherlands in 1998 and designed by German Frers. At the time of her launch, she was the largest sloop ever built, and had the tallest mast. The  carbon-fiber mast clears the deck of the Golden Gate Bridge by only .

However, Hyperion is famous primarily for her owner, Silicon Valley entrepreneur Jim Clark, founder of Silicon Graphics and Netscape, who built the yacht with the aim of replacing all conventional ship board electronics with an array of integrated, touch screen computers.

At the time of launch, all systems aboard the yacht including engines and sailing systems, environmental systems, lighting, HVAC and entertainment were controlled by a network of 30 customized Silicon Graphics computers and 22 LCD touch screens at various locations throughout the yacht.

Clark created a small company, Seascape, which worked in anonymity for many years above a Jenny Craig weight loss center in Menlo Park, California, to create the software for this one-of-a-kind project.

Much has been written about this project including a best selling book, The New New Thing by Michael Lewis.

Hyperion was surpassed as the world's largest sloop by the 48.5 m Georgia in 2000, which was surpassed by the 75.2 m Mirabella V in 2004.

See also
 Luxury yachts
Large Sailing Yachts
The Maltese Falcon
Athena
Eos
List of large sailing yachts
List of large sailing vessels
Comparison of large sloops

References

External links
Hyperion - Royal Huisman - The spirit of individuality

Individual sailing vessels